David Yaari (born David Borowich in 1969) is an American - Israeli entrepreneur, philanthropist, community organizer and activist.  He is the Founding Director General of the Arizona-Israel Trade and Investment Office. He is also the chairman of the World Confederation of United Zionists and sits on the board of Keren Kayemet LeYisrael (KKL) - Jewish National Fund (JNF). He currently serves on the Board of Directors of StellarNova, an education technology company focused on STEM and on numerous philanthropic boards. In 2008, The Jewish Daily Forward included him in the "Forward 50", a list of the year's 50 most influential Jewish Americans.

Biography 
David was born in Lexington, Kentucky, the firstborn son of Dr. Abba Borowich and Sandra Horowitz. The family moved to New Rochelle, New York where he attended Westchester Day School and then continued to the Ramaz School in Manhattan. He received a Bachelor of Arts in Political Science from Yeshiva University and a Master of Business Administration from New York University.  After his undergraduate study at Yeshiva, he moved to Israel and served in the Israeli Defense Forces as a platoon corporal and gunner in the 500th Brigade in the Tank corps.

Professional life 
Yaari was a Senior Vice President with the RAI Group, a specialty finance company, where he led the company's national private label credit card business. He was also the Chief Operating Officer at Optinetix, an Optical Messaging company and as Senior Vice President of Business Development and Marketing at Tantian Corporation, an Enterprise software company. Yaari spent several years as a Strategy Consultant with Cap Gemini/Ernst & Young's Management Consulting Strategic Advisory Services practice where he specialized in the e-commerce and Financial Services industries. He has also worked in marketing and business development at American Express and in account management at advertising agency Ogilvy & Mather.

In 2018, Yaari sold iSpa Express, the national retail cosmetics chain he co-founded in 2011 after having grown the company to 10 retail locations across Israel, with over 180 employees.

In late 2019, following an announcement from Governor Doug Ducey and the Arizona Commerce Authority, Yaari launched the first Arizona-Israel Trade and Investment Office, where he serves as Director General.

Community and Civic Life 
Yaari has been active with several philanthropic organizations, including many which he founded.

In 1991, while serving as Vice President of the Yeshiva College Student Government, he organized and led "Operation Torah Shield", an emergency relief mission to Israel during the Gulf War during Operation Desert Shield. In 1999, he co-founded and Chaired the "J2J Network", a networking organization dedicated to strengthening the Jewish community through commerce. In 2003, he founded and chaired "Dor Chadash", an organization that fosters ties between Israeli and American Jews through cultural exchange programs and events., which has since merged with the Israeli American Council. In 2007, he founded and Chaired the Council of Young Jewish Presidents.

During that time, Yaari also served on the Executive Committee of the Jewish Community Relations Council of New York, on which he served as Chairman of its Israel and International Affairs commission.

For Israel's 60th anniversary in 2008, David conceived of and chaired the official New York celebration at Radio City Music Hall and was selected as the Grand Marshall of the 2008 Salute to Israel Parade.

Upon arriving in Israel, he was appointed as the CEO of Hillel Israel, the Israeli affiliate of Hillel International. He has served on the national board of "Alut", Israel's Autism society and served on the General Assembly and Audit committee of HaShomer Hachadash.

Currently Yaari is the Chairman of the World Confederation of United Zionists, sits on the Board of Directors of KKL and of Israel's Nature and Heritage Foundation - Israel's National Park Service, as well as the World Zionist Organization and on the General Assembly of Israel's Society for International Development.

The Jewish Daily Forward ranked him one of the 50 most influential Jewish Americans in 2008.

Political life
In 1990, Yaari worked for Indiana U.S. Senator Dan Coats, on a fellowship sponsored by the Institute for Public Affairs. In 1992, he was appointed executive director of the American Friends of Likud Party, based in New York. In 2004, he was part of a dedicated team to work in Florida to help re-elect President George W. Bush and during that time served on the Knesset’s international committee to develop an Israeli Constitution.

In 2017, Yaari arranged a briefing on the state of AntiSemitism at the Israeli Knesset which was attended by EU Ambassadors, NGO representatives and several members of Israel's Parliament.

Personal life
In 2008, Yaari married Sivan, the founder of Innovation: Africa. In 2009 the couple moved to Israel and since 2011, they live in Tel Aviv with their three children.

Recognition 
 New York University's President's Leadership Award
 Belkin Memorial Award, 1991
 Joseph Taggart Memorial Award from the Stern School of Business, 1998.
 2005 Community leadership award from New York City Mayor Michael Bloomberg
 Herzl Prize, 2004

References

New York University Stern School of Business alumni
Yeshiva University alumni
Jewish American bankers
1969 births
Living people
Jewish activists
Jewish American philanthropists
Businesspeople from New Rochelle, New York
Philanthropists from New York (state)
Activists from New Rochelle, New York
Israeli businesspeople
Israeli activists
American emigrants to Israel
21st-century American Jews